Almir Klica (born 10 November 1998) is a Montenegrin professional footballer who plays as a left-back for Luxembourgish club Jeunesse Esch.

Career
Klica started his career with Luxembourgish side Jeunesse. Before the second half of 2021–22, he signed for Olympiacos B in Greece. On 19 February 2022, Klica debuted for Olympiacos B during a 1–2 loss to Larissa.

References

External links
 

1998 births
Association football defenders
Expatriate footballers in Greece
Expatriate footballers in Luxembourg
Jeunesse Esch players
Living people
Luxembourg National Division players
Montenegrin expatriate footballers
Montenegrin expatriate sportspeople in Greece
Montenegrin footballers
Super League Greece 2 players
Olympiacos F.C. B players
Montenegrin expatriate sportspeople in Luxembourg